George C. Schneller was the second presiding bishop of the Orthodox Anglican Church and Metropolitan of the Orthodox Anglican Communion.  He was born on February 22, 1921, in St. Louis, Missouri.

He was ordained to the priesthood on December 8, 1973, by James Parker Dees, and served as the rector of Holy Cross Anglican Church in St. Louis, Missouri for over two decades. He was consecrated to the episcopate on October 27, 1991, by Hesbon O. Njera, Presiding Bishop of Kenya and Laione Q. Vuki, a bishop in Polynesia, both were bishops of the Orthodox Anglican Communion.  Schneller served his alma mater (1973) as the second president of Cranmer Seminary during the same period. Following the death of his wife and having health difficulties of his own, on January 9, 1993, he resigned his position as presiding bishop.

External links
Orthodox Anglican Communion website
Burial in Affton, St. Louis County, Missouri.

Presiding Bishops of the Anglican Orthodox Church
2000 deaths
1921 births